The Ruixiang X5 is a five to seven-seat Mid-size crossover SUV produced by Ruixiang, a sub-brand of Yinxiang Group and BAIC Motor.

History 
In June 2020, declaration information of a crossover SUV called the Wojie TX7 was obtained from the Chinese Ministry of Industry and Information Technology. The same vehicle was actually declared to have belonged to Weichai Motor. Through the updated information, it was understood that Weichai may launch another new brand called WOJIE, with the TX7 being the brand's first new car. One year later in June 2021, declaration information of a crossover SUV called the Ruixiang X5 declared to have belonged to Yinxiang Group surfaced just days after the Ruixiang brand reveal. The Yinxiang Group later revealed that the company name is now Ruixiang.

Powertrain 
The Ruixiang X5 is powered by a 1.5 liter inline-four turbo engine producing 156Ps and 115 kW, with the engine mated to either a six-speed manual gearbox or a six-speed automatic gearbox.

References

External links 
 Official Website

Cars introduced in 2021
Mid-size sport utility vehicles
Front-wheel-drive vehicles
2020s cars
Cars of China